Jean-Baptiste Fischer  was an early twentieth century French road racing cyclist who won the 1901 Paris–Tours and participated in the 1903 Tour de France in 1903, where he finished fifth.

Palmarès 

1901
Paris–Tours
Bordeaux- Paris: 3°
 3rd Brussels–Roubaix

 1902
 Paris Roubaix: 6°

1903
 Tour de France: 5°

1867 births
Year of death missing
French male cyclists
Sportspeople from Haut-Rhin
Cyclists from Grand Est